Central Valley is a hamlet in Orange County, New York, United States. The population was 1,857 at the 2000 census, at which time it was a census-designated place. It is part of the Poughkeepsie–Newburgh–Middletown, NY Metropolitan Statistical Area as well as the larger New York–Newark–Bridgeport, NY-NJ-CT-PA Combined Statistical Area.

Central Valley is in the southern part of the Town and Village of Woodbury. It is located along the New York State Thruway (Interstate 87 at Exit 16, approximately 95 miles south of Albany and 50 miles north of New York City.

The Woodbury Common Premium Outlets center is located in Central Valley.

Geography
Central Valley is located at  (41.329371, -74.125036).

History
Meteorologist Jen Carfagno of The Weather Channel reported in Central Valley for an early March snowstorm in 2018 dubbed as "Quinn".

Demographics
At the 2000 census there were 1,857 people, 656 households, and 509 families in the CDP. The population density was 696.4 per square mile (268.5/km2). There were 679 housing units at an average density of 254.6/sq mi (98.2/km2).  The racial makeup of the CDP was 94.02% White, 0.75% African American, 0.22% Native American, 1.35% Asian, 2.75% from other races, and 0.92% from two or more races. Hispanic or Latino of any race were 7.92%.

Of the 656 households 38.3% had children under the age of 18 living with them, 66.3% were married couples living together, 9.0% had a female householder with no husband present, and 22.3% were non-families. 17.5% of households were one person and 6.6% were one person aged 65 or older. The average household size was 2.83 and the average family size was 3.22.

The age distribution was 26.7% under the age of 18, 6.7% from 18 to 24, 30.4% from 25 to 44, 25.1% from 45 to 64, and 11.1% 65 or older. The median age was 37 years. For every 100 females, there were 99.0 males. For every 100 females age 18 and over, there were 97.4 males.

The median household income was $69,167 and the median family income  was $79,690. Males had a median income of $51,890 versus $36,829 for females. The per capita income for the CDP was $29,205. About 1.3% of families and 3.2% of the population were below the poverty line, including 3.7% of those under age 18 and none of those age 65 or over.

References

Hamlets in Orange County, New York
Hamlets in New York (state)
Poughkeepsie–Newburgh–Middletown metropolitan area